James Shanks Towers (April 24, 1859 – April 18, 1926) was an American farmer, businessman, and politician.

Born in the town of Caledonia, Columbia County, Wisconsin, Towers went to Portage High School in Portage, Wisconsin. Towers was a farmer and served on the board of directors of the Merrimac State Bank. Towers served as chairman of the Caledonia Town Board and on the Columbia County Board of Supervisors. He also served on the school board. In 1909, Towers served in the Wisconsin State Assembly and was a Republican. Towers died at his home in Portage, Wisconsin from a long illness.

References

1859 births
1926 deaths
People from Columbia County, Wisconsin
Businesspeople from Wisconsin
Farmers from Wisconsin
County supervisors in Wisconsin
Mayors of places in Wisconsin
School board members in Wisconsin
Republican Party members of the Wisconsin State Assembly
People from Portage, Wisconsin